Halfway is a rock band from Brisbane, Australia.  the group have released eight studio albums, most recently On the Ghostline, with Hands of Lightning, released in August 2022. Previous to this the band released, Restless Dream (2021), which was a collaboration between Halfway and Aboriginal Australian elder, Bob Weatherall.

History
Halfway was formed in 2000 by John Busby, Elwin Hawtin, Ben Johnson and Chris Dale in Windsor, Brisbane. The lineup was later rounded out with the addition of Dublin-born brothers Noel Fitzpatrick (pedal steel) and Liam Fitzpatrick (banjo/mandolin). Three of the bands founding members, John Busby, Elwin Hawtin and Chris Dale all originally hail from the Central Queensland town of Rockhampton. 

Halfway's debut album Farewell to the Fainthearted was released in 2003 to warm critical acclaim. The band toured nationally, and their single "Patience Back" received high rotation airplay on Triple J. Farewell to the Fainthearted was included in The Courier-Mail's Top 10 albums of 2003.

In September 2006, Halfway released their second studio album, Remember the River. It was recorded by Wayne Connolly (The Vines, Josh Pyke, You Am I) the album saw Radio Birdman frontman Rob Younger in the producer's chair. The album received much acclaim from critics, and generated interest in Europe and the UK, where it received airplay on BBC Radio. Remember the River was included in The Courier-Mail's Top 10 albums of 2006.

In 2008, the band's core songwriting duo (Busby and Dale) were the recipients of one of Australia's most prestigious songwriting awards – The Grant McLennan Fellowship. The selection panel included members of the Go-Betweens, the McLennan family and Arts Queensland.

2009 saw the band recruit former Go-Betweens frontman Robert Forster to produce their third album. After months of rehearsal under Forster's guidance, a new LP was recorded, entitled  An Outpost of Promise. 

In 2010, the band added John Willsteed (ex-The Go-Betweens) on guitar, and Luke Peacock on keyboards.

In February 2014, Halfway released their fourth album, Any Old Love, which was again produced by Forster. At the AIR Awards of 2014, the album won Best Independent Country Album.

In 2015, the song "Dulcify" from Any Old Love won "Song of the Year" & "Best Country Song" at the Queensland Music Awards.

The band's fifth studio album, The Golden Halfway Record, was released in April 2016. It was recorded in Nashville, Tennessee, by lauded producer Mark Nevers (Calexico, Bonnie Prince Billy, George Jones), the album was met with a series of five star reviews.

2018 saw the release of the band's sixth album Rain Lover. Produced by Mark Nevers and Halfway, Rain Lover’s central narrative is based around the life of John Busby's father. It is a story of big dreams, conflict and addiction with songs that include real people and characters from the Central Queensland town of Rockhampton in the 1960s-1980s. The album received a 5-star review in The Australian newspaper on the week of release.

In 2021 the band released their seventh album, Restless Dream, a collaboration with Kamilaroi elder Bob Weatherall and didgeridoo player William Barton.  The record's central themes are based around the work of Weatherall in the repatriation of Aboriginal remains from museums and institutions around the world. The album was nominated in the 2021 ARIA Music Awards for Best World Music Album. 

The band's eighth studio album, On the Ghostline, with Hands of Lightning was released in August 2022  which was recorded by Yanto Browning and produced and mixed by Malcolm Burn (Bob Dylan, Iggy Pop, Emmylou Harris, Patti Smith & The Neville Brothers) at La Maison Bleu Studio, Kingston, NY. Tony Moore wrote in The Sydney Morning Herald: "Ghost nets floating lost at sea are the core image as the band trap the power of memories and sing of Australian dreams and triumphs".

Discography

Studio albums

Live albums

Compilation albums

Awards and nominations

ARIA Awards
The Australian Recording Industry Association Music Awards is an annual series of awards celebrating the Australian music industry.

APRA Awards
The APRA music awards in Australia are an annual awards ceremony celebrating excellence in contemporary music.

AIR Awards
The Australian Independent Record Awards (commonly known informally as AIR Awards) is an annual awards night to recognise, promote and celebrate the success of Australia's Independent Music sector.

|-
| AIR Awards of 2011
| An Outpost Of Promise
| Best Independent Country Album
| 
|-
| AIR Awards of 2014
| Any Old Love
| Best Independent Country Album
| 
|-
| AIR Awards of 2017
| The Golden Halfway Record
| Best Independent Country Album
| 
|-
| AIR Awards of 2018
|Live at the Triffid 
| Best Independent Country Album
| 
|-
| AIR Awards of 2019
|Rain Lover
| Best Independent Country Album
| 
|-

Grant McLennan Memorial Fellowship 
The Grant McLennan Fellowship is a $25,000 award given to a Queensland contemporary music songwriter or songwriting duo with exceptional talent. Named in honour of Go-Betweens co-songwriter and front man, Grant McLennan. The prize money is used to travel to a choice of one of his three favourite cities, Berlin, London or New York, to further their song writing craft and experience by travelling over seas.

|-
| 2007|| John Busby & Chris Dale || GMMF ||
|-
| 2008|| John Busby & Chris Dale || GMMF ||
|}

Queensland Music Awards
The Queensland Music Awards (previously known as Q Song Awards) are annual awards celebrating Queensland, Australia's brightest emerging artists and established legends. They commenced in 2006.

 
|-
|rowspan="2"| 2015
|rowspan="2"|"Dulcify"
| Song of the Year
| 
|-
| Country Song of the Year
| 
|-
| 2017
| "Three in and There’s Nothing But the Stars"
| Country Song of the Year
| 
|}

References

Musical groups established in 2000
Musical groups from Brisbane
Australian alternative country groups